Palo Duro Canyon is a canyon system of the Caprock Escarpment located in the Texas Panhandle near the cities of Amarillo and Canyon. Palo Duro Canyon (from the Spanish meaning "hard stick") has been named "The Grand Canyon of Texas" both for its size and for its dramatic geological features, including the multicolored layers of rock and steep mesa walls, which are similar to those in the Grand Canyon. It is part of Palo Duro Canyon State Park.

Geology

The canyon was formed by the Prairie Dog Town Fork Red River, which initially winds along the level surface of the Llano Estacado of West Texas, then suddenly and dramatically runs off the Caprock Escarpment.  Water erosion over the millennia has shaped the canyon's geological formations.

Notable canyon formations include caves and hoodoos. One of the best-known and the major signature feature of the canyon is the Lighthouse Rock. A multiple-use,  round-trip loop trail is dedicated to the formation.

Palo Duro Canyon was downcut by the Prairie Dog Town Fork Red River, during the Pleistocene, when the whole region was uplifted.  Most of the strata visible in the canyon were deposited during the Permian and Triassic periods. From oldest to youngest, and each separated by an unconformity, the formations are:

The Quartermaster Formation is Permian in age, and forms the red, lower slopes of the Canyon. This layer was deposited in a near-shore shallow-marine environment consisting of siltstones and shales with ripple marks and cross bedding, that alternated with dry tidal flats indicated by satin spar gypsum  and halite cast evaporite deposits.  The red color indicates periods of oxidation.  The Quartermaster Formation forms the lower wall and canyon floor, averaging  in thickness where it outcrops.  In particular, this alternating red and white formation forms the steep and gullied lower portion of the north flank of Timber Mesa, with the maroon and lavender smooth slopes of the Tecovas Shale above.

The Tecovas Formation is a part of the Dockum Group with the Trujillo Formation. This multicolored Triassic unit consists of shale, siltstone, and sandstone. Deposited in streams and swamps, its colors indicate varying oxidizing conditions, and the alternating dry/wet cycles typical of such environments. These rocks are fossiliferous, containing the remains of phytosaurs, amphibians, and fish, including Metoposaurus, Desmatosuchus, Koskinonodon, and lungfish, besides coprolites and the petrified wood remains of Araucarioxylon. Septarian calcite concretions and calcite geodes are numerous, and the shale forms the less steep canyon walls covered by talus slopes. Lavender, gray and white shales lie below this sandstone, while an orange shale lies between this sandstone and the Trujillo Formation above. The Quartermaster and Tecovas Formations make up Capital Peak. Likewise, the lower third of Triassic Peak is composed of the deeply furrowed Quartermaster Formation, overlain by the gentle slopes and smooth surface of the Tecovas Formation shales, all capped by the weather-resistant Trujillo Formation sandstone. Large blocks of this sandstone, due to mass wasting, are found along the flanks and base of the peak.

The Trujillo Formation is a Triassic formation that is harder than the underlying Tecovas and forms many of the Canyon's ledges. Composed of coarse sandstone, river cross-bedding indicates deposition in a stream environment. Fossils are rare.  The sandstone has alternating layers of shale and marl-pebble conglomerate.  The formation is massively bedded sandstone, making a distinct contact with the underlying Tecovas Formation, forming cliffs, prominent benches and mesas within the canyon.  The formation includes a basal, middle, and upper sandstone members, separated by shales.  The middle sandstone member forms conspicuous ledges and cliffs.  Phytosaur and Koskinonodon remains, plus leaf imprints and mineralized wood have been found within the formation.  Erosion-resistant sandstones protect pedestals of underlying shale, giving rise to hoodoos, including the Lighthouse, and the hoodoo at the south end of Capitol Peak.  Likewise, the Rock Garden is composed of Trujillo sandstone boulders.

The Ogallala Formation is a late Miocene to early Pliocene unit which forms the cliffs and ledges at the very top of the canyon. It is composed of sandstone, siltstone, and conglomerate eroded from a late Cenozoic uplift of the Rocky Mountains, and is separated from the lower Trujillo Formation by a disconformity, representing a long hiatus. The coarse, porous sedimentary units of the Ogallala Formation constitute the Ogallala Aquifer, which has historically functioned as a major source of drinking water for much of the High Plains.  Fossils of saber-toothed cats (Smilodon), bone-crushing dogs (Borophagus), mastodons, horses, long-necked camels (Aepycamelus), rhinoceroses, and large tortoises up to 3 feet in length, are present in the Ogallala.  The siltstone and sandstone have been cemented by silica, which gives rise to the occurrence of common opal and almost-chert pockets.  The upper portion of the formation has thick deposits of caliche, very evident at the Coronado Lodge on the northwest rim of the canyon.  Fortress Cliff, on the eastern rim of the canyon, has a spectacular exposure of the Ogallala Formation.

Headward erosion by the Prairie Dog Town fork of the Red River, into the caprock escarpment of the Llano Estacado, caused differential erosion.  This meant the more resistant Ogallala and Trujillo formations formed the steeper walls of the canyon.

History

The first evidence of human habitation of the canyon dates back about 10,000–15,000 years, and it is believed to have been continuously inhabited to the present day. Native Americans were attracted to the water of the Prairie Dog Town Fork Red River, as well as the consequent ample game, edible plants, and protection from the weather the canyon provided.

The first European explorers to discover the canyon were members of the Coronado expedition, who visited the canyon in 1541. Apache Indians lived in Palo Duro at the time, but they were later displaced by Comanche and Kiowa tribes, who had the advantage of owning horses brought over by the Spanish. They had contact with traders, called Comancheros, in nearby New Mexico.

A United States military team under Captain Randolph B. Marcy mapped the canyon in 1852 during their search for the headwaters of the Red River. The land remained under American Indian control until a military expedition led by Colonel Ranald S. Mackenzie was sent in 1874 to remove the Indians to reservations in Oklahoma. The Mackenzie expedition captured about 1,200 of the Indians' horses and slaughtered them in nearby Tule Canyon during the Battle of Palo Duro Canyon. The Comanche and Kiowa conceded and left the area.

Soon after, in 1876, Charles Goodnight and a wealthy Ulster Scot named John Adair established the JA Ranch in Palo Duro Canyon. Col. Goodnight helped manage the ranch until 1890.  Over the next half-century, the canyon remained in private hands but was an increasingly popular tourist spot for residents.

Charles N. Gould made a geologic map of the canyon and named the formations in 1905.

In 1931, a major landowner signed a two-year contract with the local chamber of commerce to allow public access to the canyon. The upper section of the canyon was purchased by the State of Texas in 1934 and turned into the  Palo Duro Canyon State Park. Amarillo is the largest city near Palo Duro Canyon State Park, but the smaller city of Canyon is nearer. In 1976, Palo Duro Canyon State Park was designated as a National Natural Landmark by the National Park Service.

Seven units of the Civilian Conservation Corps developed the park from 1933 until 1937.  Four groups of veterans, two groups of African Americans, and one junior group took part in various construction projects, starting with the construction of Park Road 5, a two-lane road from the rim to the floor of the canyon.  Other projects included the headquarters building, culverts, low-water crossings, bridges, Spring House, Well House, the Coronado Lodge interpretive center, 4 overnight cabins known as Cow Camp, and the 3 rim cabins.  In addition, picnic and camping areas were built, complete with tables, seats, fireplaces, and garbage receptacles.

The Texas Department of Transportation has built bridges over Water crossings 1, 2, and 6 to allow motorists easier access during and after heavy rains. Paving work has been completed at the Juniper Multi-use Area, with the addition of utilities pending. Campsites and pavilions have also been added, along with several hiking trails.

Tourism and activities 
Palo Duro Canyon is part of the Texas State Parks system under Texas Parks and Wildlife. Day entry in to the park is covered by the Texas Parks Pass.

Palo Duro Canyon hosts several activities throughout the park. There are 16 trails for hiking, biking, and horseback riding, ranging in length from .05 miles to  4.4 miles. There are options for camping, with sites for tents with water access and RV campers alike. There are also sites for keeping horses available to campers planning to horseback ride in the canyon. In addition, lodging cabins are available for rent that sit on the outer rim of the canyon, providing an impressive view of both the canyon and the sunrise.

Group sites and spaces are available for group retreats, youth groups, and weddings. The Mack Dick Pavilion is a popular location for weddings and receptions, as the canyon provides a beautiful backdrop.

In culture

The painter Georgia O'Keeffe, who lived in nearby Amarillo and Canyon in the early 20th century, wrote of the Palo Duro: "It is a burning, seething cauldron, filled with dramatic light and color." She made paintings of Palo Duro Canyon between 1916 and 1918, when she was an instructor and head of the art department at West Texas State Normal College.

Palo Duro Canyon is the site of an outdoor historical and musical drama, titled Texas, presented annually each summer by actors, singers, dancers, and artists of the Texas Panhandle region. The spectacle, created by playwright Paul Eliot Green, premiered on July 1, 1966, at the newly constructed Pioneer Amphitheatre in Palo Duro Canyon State Park. It has continued each summer through the present, making Texas "the best-attended outdoor history drama in the nation."

American composer Samuel Jones's Symphony No. 3 is titled "Palo Duro Canyon." It premiered May 1, 1992, in an outdoor performance at the Palo Duro Canyon State Park's Pioneer Amphitheatre, with James Setapen conducting the Amarillo Symphony (which had commissioned the work). The composer writes: "I wanted the piece ... to conjure up an intuitive awareness of the long movements of time required for the creation of a canyon. I also wanted in some way to pay homage to Native Americans, to whom this canyon was a sacred place. And I wanted to capture in music that magical moment which everyone experiences when they first see the flat, treeless High Plains fall dizzyingly away into the colorful vastness of the Palo Duro Canyon itself." A KACV-TV documentary on the canyon, composer, and symphony, titled And There Will Be Sounds, was broadcast on PBS stations nationally later that year; and a commercial recording was subsequently released by the Seattle Symphony under the baton of Gerard Schwarz.
A second recording was released in 2018 as part of a multichannel SACD titled 'American Symphonies' on the Swedish BIS label, with Lance Friedel conducting the London Symphony Orchestra.

See also

Blanco Canyon
Caprock Canyons State Park and Trailway
Double Mountain Fork Brazos River
Duffy's Peak
High Plains
Ogallala Aquifer
Mushaway Peak
Salt Fork Brazos River
Texas State Highway 207
Yellow House Canyon
Yellow House Draw

References

External links

Palo Duro Canyon State Park official website
Texas Parks and Wildlife: Palo Duro Canyon
Read Exploration of the Red River, by Randolph Marcy, 1852, hosted by the Portal to Texas History.
Handbook of Texas Online: Palo Duro Canyon

Unique Perspectives of Palo Duro Canyon; Pictures and Panoramas
Film of Palo Duro Canyon from Adventure at Our Door on the Texas Archive of the Moving Image

Protected areas of Armstrong County, Texas
Canyons and gorges of Texas
Protected areas of Randall County, Texas
Rock formations of Texas
State parks of Texas
National Natural Landmarks in Texas
Geography of Amarillo, Texas
Civilian Conservation Corps in Texas
Landforms of Armstrong County, Texas
Landforms of Randall County, Texas
Protected areas established in 1934
1934 establishments in Texas
Canyons and gorges of the United States
Red River of the South